An armoured recovery vehicle (ARV) is typically a powerful tank or armoured personnel carrier (APC) chassis modified for use during combat for military vehicle recovery (towing) or repair of battle-damaged, stuck, and/or inoperable armoured fighting vehicles, such as tanks and armoured personnel carriers. Most ARVs have motorized tracks, like a tank or bulldozer, enabling the ARV to operate on uneven ground. The term "Armoured Repair and Recovery Vehicle" (ARRV) is also used. 

ARVs may have winches, jibs, cranes, and/or bulldozer blades to aid in tank recovery. Typically, any specialized lifting and recovery equipment replaces the turret and cannon found on a battle tank. ARVs may in some cases have electric generators, blowtorches, chainsaws and fuel pumps to help with recovery operations, or spare parts, to facilitate field repairs. Some ARVs have a spade component to anchor the vehicle when it is towing or lifting. Since most ARVs are based on tank or APC chassis, they have an armoured crew cockpit and engine, which means that ARVs can be operated in combat conditions. Rarely, an ARV may be armed, such as some M32s, which have an 81 mm mortar for screening purposes, and the M88, which has a .50 cal heavy machine gun. One WWII M4 Sherman-based ARV had a dummy gun installed where the turret would normally go.

Early ARVs in WWII were often repurposed tanks, with the turret and armament removed and replaced with some type of winch. In the 2010s, ARVs are generally factory-built. Even so, ARVs often use a shared chassis that is used on an army's other fighting vehicles, as this facilitates repair and maintenance of the ARV (since the same parts can be used on the ARV and the vehicles it supports). 

Some ARVs are operated in tandem with armoured bulldozers. ARVs generally can only tow an equivalent-class vehicle or one that is lighter in weight. As such, an APC chassis-based ARV can only tow and recover an APC, but not a much heavier tank. While most ARVs are made from or based on APC or tank chassis, more rarely, an ARV may be based on an artillery tractor chassis. Some ARVs have specialized equipment that enables them to operate on beaches or in shallow water.

Development history

Early models 

During World War I, some British Mark IV heavy tanks were fitted with jibs to produce "salvage tanks", but the majority of their work was at the tank parks in aid of moving, maintaining, and repairing damaged tanks.

Second World War 

The first true ARVs were introduced in World War II, often by converting obsolete or damaged tanks, usually by removing the turret and installing a heavy-duty winch to free stuck vehicles, plus a variety of vehicle repair tools. Some were also purpose-built in factories, using an existing tank chassis with a hull superstructure to accommodate repair and recovery equipment. Many of the latter type of ARV had an A-frame or crane to allow the vehicle's crew to perform heavy lifting tasks, such as removing the engine from a disabled tank.

Postwar 
After World War II, most countries' MBT models also had corresponding ARV variants. Many ARVs are also equipped with a bulldozer blade that can be used as an anchor when winching or as a stabiliser when lifting, a pump to transfer fuel to another vehicle, and more. Some can even carry a spare engine for field replacement, such as the German Leopard 1 ARV.

Characteristics and roles 

ARVs are normally built on the chassis of a main battle tank (MBT), but some are also constructed on the basis of other armoured fighting vehicles, mostly armoured personnel carriers (APCs). ARVs are usually built on the basis of a vehicle in the same class as they are supposed to recover; a tank-based ARV is used to recover tanks, while an APC-based one recovers APCs (it does not have the power to tow a much heavier tank). ARVs with a crane can be used to lift and place concrete fortifications in place and help with other battlefield engineering.

Some combat engineering vehicles (CEVs) are based on ARVs.

List 
The following is a list of ARVs by country, either designer/manufacturer or user.

Argentina
TAM VCRT, based on Tanque Argentino Mediano

Austria
SB-20 Greif, based on SK-105 Kürassier

Canada

Ram ARV (WWII)
AVGP Husky (1976–present)
MTVR (-present)
Bison MRV(-present)
Leopard 2 ARV (-present)

Czechoslovakia
VT-34 ARV, based on T-34 chassis
JT-34 crane tank, based on T-34 chassis 
VT-55A ARV, based on T-55 Chassis
VT-72B ARV, based on T-72 chassis  -  (1987 to 1989)
VPV Brem-Tch, based on BVP-1 chassis (Czech build BMP)  -  (1985 to 1989)

Denmark
 Wisent 1 ARV based on the Bergepanzer - Leopard 1 tank

 France 
 M32 Tank Recovery Vehicle, based on the Sherman tank (from 1944)
 M74 Tank Recovery Vehicle (1954–1975)
 AMX 30 D (from 1973), based on the AMX 30 
 Char de dépannage DNG/DCL, based on the AMX-56 Leclerc

 Indonesia 
 AMX-D
 Anoa ARV - Indonesian recovery/engineering vehicle based on Anoa APCs featuring a 12-ton telescopic crane, 6-ton winch, chainsaw, blow torch and an electric generator.
 Bergepanzer 3 "Büffel" - Leopard 2 chassis
 BREM-Ch
 BREM-L
 M32 Tank Recovery Vehicle
 M113A1-B-Rec - recovery vehicle with a heavy internal winch. Similar to M806. Supplied by Sabiex, Belgium.
 M113A1-B-MTC - Maintenance vehicle with hydraulic HIAB crane. Similar to the M579. Supplied by Sabiex, Belgium.
 Stormer Recovery

Japan
Se-Ri Tank Recovery Vehicle - Type 97 Chi-Ha Tank chassis
Type 70 Tank Recovery Vehicle - Type 61 Roku-ichi Tank chassis
Type 78 Tank Recovery Vehicle - Type 74 Nana-yon Tank chassis
Type 90 Tank Recovery Vehicle - Type 90 Kyū-maru Tank chassis
Type 11 Tank Recovery Vehicle - Type 10 Hito-maru Tank chassis

Germany

World War 2
Bergepanzer III - PzKpfw III chassis
Bergepanzer IV - PzKpfw IV chassis
Bergepanther (Sd.Kfz. 179) - PzKpfw V Panther chassis 347 produced (1943 to 1945).Bergetiger - PzKpfw VI Tiger I chassisBergepanzer 38(t) - Jagdpanzer 38 chassis, 170 produced (1944 to 1945).Bergepanzer T-34 - Captured T-34 chassis

Modern
Bergepanzer M74 (Sherman Chassis) - first TRV/ARV of the West German Bundeswehr, 300 used 1956-1960 (see M74 entry under United States).Bergepanzer 1 - M88 Chassis, the first of 125 entered service in 1962 and a 1985 modernization program replaced the gasoline engine with a diesel and improved the hoist.Bergepanzer 2 - Leopard 1 tank chassis. Used by the Canadian Forces since the 1990s as Taurus ARV.
Bergepanzer 3 "Büffel" - Leopard 2 chassis
Bergepanzer Wisent - Bergepanzer 2 chassis. Modified and upgraded by Flensburger Fahrzeugbau to support the demands of the future battlefield. Optimised to support the Leopard 1 and 2 main battle tanks.
Bergepanzer Wisent 2 - Leopard 2 chassis. Successor of the Wisent. Build by Flensburger Fahrzeugbau.

Israel

Trail Blazer (Gordon) (Sherman chassis) - An IDF recovery/engineering vehicle based on HVSS equipped M4A1s Sherman tanks, it featured a large single boom crane (as opposed to the A-Frame of the M32) and large spades at the front and rear of the vehicle to assist in lifting. It could also tow up to 72 tons.
 "Technical" and "Fitter" - ARVs based on the M-113 with crane attached
Nemera - modern recovery vehicle based on Merkava tank chassis. Several prototypes have been built, but it never fielded in large number in the IDF.
 The current ARV in IDF use is the American-made M88 Recovery Vehicle, which is accompanied and assisted by an IDF Caterpillar D9 armoured bulldozer.

Malaysia
 WZT-4 build by Polish Bumar-ŁabędyMexico
 M32 Chenca (Sherman chassis) - In 1998, Napco International of the USA upgraded M32B1 TRV M4 Sherman-chassis armoured recovery vehicles with Detroit Diesel 8V-92-T diesel engines (see M32 entry under United States).

Poland
CW-34 (T-34 Chassis)
WPT-34 (T-34, SU-85 and SU-100 Chassis)
WZT-1 (T-54 and T-55 Chassis)
WZT-2 (T-55 Chassis)
WZT-3 (T-72M Chassis)
WZT-4 (PT-91M Chassis) produced for Malaysia
WPT-TOPAS (TOPAS Chassis)
WPT-MORS (MTLB Chassis)
KWZT "MAMMOTH" Heavy Wheeled Evacuation and Technical Rescue Vehicle (TATRA T 815 – 7Z0R9T 44 440 8x8.1R Chassis)

Serbia/Yugoslavia

 M-84ABI - The ARV based on Yugoslav/Serbian M-84 MBT.
 VIU-55 Munja

Soviet Union/Russia
The Russian acronym BREM (cyr. БРЭМ) stands for "бронированная ремонтно-эвакуационная машина", literally "armoured repair and recovery vehicle".
 BTS-2 (T-54 Chassis)
 BTS-4A (T-44 Chassis)
 BREM-1 (T-72 Chassis)
 BREM-2 (BMP-1 Chassis)
 BREM-L (BMP-3 Chassis)
 BREM-K (BTR-80 Chassis)
 BREM-80U (T-80U Chassis)
 T-16 (Armata Chassis)

Turkey
 M48A5T5 Tamay - Turkish-designed remote controlled armored recovery vehicle built on the M48 chassis.
 MPG M4K - indigenous ARV in 8x8 configuration, with 600 HP engine, an automatic transmission with torque converter also has CBRN capabilities.

United Kingdom
The British tested their first ARV designs in early 1942. The decision at the time was to focus on the Churchill infantry tank as the basis, but cruiser tank based ARVs were also produced. When the UK received supplies of US medium tanks - first the M3, then M4 Sherman, conversions were made of these to operate alongside and so simplify support.

World War II
Cavalier ARV
Churchill ARV
Crusader ARV
Centaur Arv
Cromwell ARV
Grant ARV - two Marks, the first was a British conversion, the second was a US M31 TRV in British service
Sherman III ARV I - Armoured Recovery Vehicle conversion of Sherman III (M4A2), similarly "Sherman V ARV Mark I" and "ARV Mark II"
Sherman ARV II - conversion of Sherman V with dummy gun in fixed "turret", 7.5 ton jib at front, spade earth anchor at rear.
Sherman II ARV Mk III was a M32B1 TRV (see US ARV).

Modern
Centurion ARV
FV219 - on A45 "Universal tank" chassis
FV220 Conqueror ARV
Chieftain FV4204 ARV/ARRV
FV434 "Carrier, Maintenance, Full Tracked" 
M578
Challenger Armoured Repair and Recovery Vehicle (CRARRV). The CRARRV has a large set of recovery and heavy repair tools including a man portable ultrathermic cutting system with an underwater cutting capability and a portable welding system.
FV106 Samson - complement to the Combat Vehicle Reconnaissance (Tracked) series of vehicles
FV513 Warrior Recovery Vehicle - complement to the Warrior tracked armoured vehicles

BARV (World War II to Modern)

The BARV is a British military support vehicle, the name coming from "Beach Armoured Recovery Vehicle", for working in shallow water. BARVs were used to free operational vehicles that were stuck, and to clear the beach of inoperable vehicles or landing craft, to make way for other forces. Various models were based on the M4A2 Sherman, Centurion and Leopard 1A5 ("Hippo") tank chassis. Australia converted a M3A5 Grant to a BARV configuration. The first BARV was a Sherman M4A2 tank which had been waterproofed and had the turret replaced by a tall armoured superstructure. Around 60 were deployed on the invasion beaches during the Battle of Normandy. The crew included a diver whose job was to go underwater to attach towing chains to stuck vehicles.
 Centurion tank.

United States

 M25 Tank Transporter- Tractor unit could serve a dual purpose as a recovery vehicle.

M31 Tank Recovery Vehicle - based on M3 Lee chassis. (sometimes called a T2 tank retriever)
An 81 mm mortar was also added into the hull, primarily for screening purposes.
M32B1 - M32s converted from M4A1s (some converted to M34 artillery prime mover tractors).
M32A1B1 - M32B1s with HVSS, later removing the 81 mm mortar and incorporating crane improvements.
M32B2 - M32s converted from M4A2s.
M32B3 - M32s converted from M4A3s.
M32A1B3 - M32B3s brought up to M32A1B1 standard.
M32B4 - M32s converted from M4A4s.
M74 Armored Recovery Vehicle - Upgrade of the M32 to provide the same capability for heavier post-war tanks, converted from M4A3 HVSS tanks. In appearance, the M74 is very similar to the M32, fitted with an A-Frame crane, a main towing winch, an auxiliary winch, and a manual utility winch. The M74 also has a front-mounted spade that can be used as a support or as a dozer blade.
M74B1 - Same as the M74, but converted from M32B3s.
M578 Light Recovery Vehicle (LRV) - based on the M110 chassis.
M51 Heavy Recovery Vehicle - based on the M103 heavy tank chassis.
M88 Recovery Vehicle - based on the chassis and parts of the automotive component of the M48 Patton & M60 Patton.
M88A1 Recovery Vehicle - improved, medium, 55-ton, diesel engine.
M88A2 Hercules Recovery Vehicle - improved, heavy, 70-ton, diesel engine.
M88A3 Hercules Recovery Vehicle - is a further upgrade of the M88A2 . It is the latest member of the M88 family. It uses a modernized powertrain and has improved speed, hoisting and winching capacity also features a seventh road wheel to reduce ground pressure.

 See also 
 Armoured warfare
 Army engineering maintenance
 List of AFVs
 Tank transporter

 References 
 Notes 

 Bibliography 
Peter Chamberlain and Major-General N.W. Duncan. AFV Weapons Profiles No.35 British Armoured Recovery Vehicles + Wheels, Tracks and Transporters'' (1971) Profile Publishing

External links
 REME Museum of Technology

 
Recovery
Military recovery vehicles